Azerbaijani theatre – is a theatrical art of the Azerbaijani people.

History
Sources of Azerbaijani theatrical art lie on ancient holidays and dances.

Elements of theatrical action are in many types of Azerbaijani people's creativity – in games (“gizlanpach” – hide and seek, “kosaldigach” – polo game), game songs (“kepenek” – butterfly, “banovsha” – violet), wedding traditions (“nishan” – engagement, “duvakhgalma” – taking bride's veil off, “toy” – wedding) and holidays (“Nowruz” – spring's coming, “kev-sej” – preparation for winter).

Collective male dance “yally”, performance of skomorokhs, kandirbazs (rope-walkers), mukhraduzds and mukhrabazs, spectacles of dervish and snake charmers are initial forms of theatrical spectacles. Broadly famed national scenes such as “Kosa-kosa”, “Garavelli”, “Shah Selim”, “Kechal pahlavan”(Bald-headed strong), “Jeyran khanim” (Mrs. Jeyran), “Maral oyunu” (Deer's game), “Kaftarkos” (Hyena), “Khan-khan” (Ruler and judge), “Tapdig choban” (Shepherd Tapdig) and “Tenbel gardash” (Lazy brother) were of great importance in formation of national Azerbaijani theatre. “Kilim arasi” (Out of carpet) puppet theatre, in spectacles of which ugly appearances of everyday life, social inequality and injustice were ridiculed, is an ancient type of Azerbaijani theatrical art.

Religious-mystic spectacles were widely spread in the Middle Ages. Dramatized “Shabih” tradition, which was generally held in sorrowful Muharram month, is one of spectacles like that.

Origination of the national Azerbaijani theatre - late 19th century, early 20th century

National Azerbaijani theatre was originated in the second half of the 19th century, on the basis of a comedy by Mirza Fatali Akhundov, the first Azerbaijani playwright, prominent thinker and philosopher of Azerbaijan.

The first professional spectacle in Azerbaijani language was displayed on March 23, 1873. Hasanbay Malikov-Zardabi, pedagogue of real school and Najafgulu bey Vazirov, student of the school were initiators of the spectacle. Students of the real school played “Vizier of Lankaran Khanate” play by M.F.Akhundov on the stage of Baku Public Assembly. The second spectacle – “Haji Gara” (Miser's adventures) - another comedy by M.F.Akhundov was displayed on the hall of Baku Public Assembly, on April 17, 1873. Organization of professional theatre and staging of spectacles in Baku was stopped after the first spectacles. Zardabi was busy with creation of “Akinchi” newspaper, and Najaf bey Vazirov went to Russia for education. Opening of real school in Shusha in 1881, and elementary female school in 1894, also opening of a musical school by musical critic Kharrat Gulu and involvement of young singers there aroused interest of local intelligentsia in theatre. So, amateurish spectacles were staged by young pedagogues in Shusha, during summer holidays. In the first years, the repertoire consisted of M.F.Akhundov's works.

“New education” newspaper wrote on August 17, 1884:

Number of theatre-lovers resulted in appearance of young playwrights. H.Vazirov, teacher of native language in Russo-Tatar School in Shusha city, actively participated in amateur circle of young pedagogues, in the 1890s. In 1892, amateurs staged “Marrying – not slaking the thirst” play by H.Vazirov. This spectacle was wrecked by fanatically incited believers and actors were made to escape through back door. Muslim priesthood, who considered literature and theatre an obscene work, began to impede display of spectacles. Ruling intelligentsia of Shusha, who began a battle with such reaction, organized new spectacles. In summer of 1984, the spectacles such as “Haji Gara”, “Monsieur Jordan the botanist and famous sorcerer dervish Mastali Shah” and “Bear, the winner of rubbers” were staged one after another by young pedagogues for charitable purposes. In 1895, those actors finally finished “Marrying – not slaking the thirst” play by H.Vazirov. Success of the spectacle was mentioned in “Terjuman” newspaper.

In 1896, a new “Broken nestle” tragedy by A.Hagverdiyev was displayed in Shusha. Author of the play was director of the spectacle. In 1904, amateurs realized staging of “Othello” by W.Shakespeare. H.Vazirov was translator and performer of Othello's peace.

By the end of the 19th century, spectacles in Azerbaijani language were staged in province cities such as Nukha, Ganja, Shamakhi, Nakhchivan and others. Followers of Akhundov's drama school, Najaf bey Vazirov, Hashim bey Vazirov, Nariman Narimanov, Abdurrahim bey Hagverdiyev, Jalil Mammadguluzadeh and Suleyman Sani Akhundov, were organizers of theatrical spectacles.

In 1888, a theatrical troupe was created in Baku by active participation of S.M.Ganizade and N.Narimanov. In 1897, the first professional collective – “Muslim Drama Troupe” – was established. Repertoire of pre-revolutionary theatre consisted of works of Azerbaijani playwrights (M.F.Akhundov, N.Vazirov, H.Vazirov, N.Narimanov, A.Hagverdiyev, J.Mammadguluzade and others), and also Russian (N.V.Gogol, I.S.Turgenev and L.N.Tolstoy) and western European classics (W.Shakespeare, Schiller and Molière). Azerbaijani theatre became the center of spreading of enlightenment and democracy ideas from its first years. Morals of feudal society, oppression and despotism of landlord-capitalistic system, obscurantism and religious fanaticism were unmasked in “Fakhraddin’s tragedy”, “From the rain to shower” plays by N.Vazirov, “Broken nestle”, “Miserable young boy”, “Agha Muhammad Shah Qajar” and “Sorceress Peri” plays by A.Hagverdiyev, “Ignorance” and “Nadir Shah” plays by N.Narimanov.

New theatrical troupes, so called “comradeships” appeared under the influence of the Russian Revolution of 1905-1907. A special troupe under “Tekamul” newspaper was created in oil-producing regions along with drama circles.  Spectacles of the theatre were given in “Granvio” trade passage.

In 1908, a united drama troupe, uniting professional actors such as H.Arablinski, S.Ruhulla and A.Veli, was created under “Nijat” charity union. The troupe had a cloakroom and props. Besides that, the troupe displayed spectacles in Taghiyev Theatre and in other regions. Such spectacles as “Agha Muhammad Shah Qajar” by A.Hagverdiyev (1907), “Blacksmith Gave” by S.Sami (1908), “Robbers” (1907); “Deadmen” by J.Mammadguluzade (1916), “Othello” (1910), on which actor and director H.Arablinski had a great success and arts of who was penetrated by revolutionary and romantic inspiration, were significant events in the history of Azerbaijani theatre.

At that time such plays as “Gaveyi ahengar” (S.Sami), “Refugees” (Schiller), “Al-Mansur” (H.Heine), “Othello” (W.Shakespeare), “Willy-nilly doctor” (J.B.Molière), “The government inspector”, “Marriage” (N.V.Gogol), “The first wine-maker” (L.N.Tolstoy) and others.

In 1919, Azerbaijan State Theatre was created.

Development of Azerbaijani theatre in the Soviet period
All theatres in Azerbaijan were nationalized after establishment of the Soviet power and their repertoire was strictly controlled by authorities. Government united destroyed troupes, listed their actors to government service. National theatre acquired its further development due to financial support of the government. In 1920, a United State Theatre including Azerbaijani, Russian and Armenian drama and opera theatres was created. In 1922, Azerbaijani drama troupe was transformed into Academic Drama Theatre. In 1920, a Russian satire-agitation theatre, transformed into Baku Labor Theatre in 1923, was created. Miniatures, revues, parodies to actual socio-political and everyday life themes were staged in the theatre. Along with these, stage versions of classic literature (“The Overcoat” by N.V.Gogol, “The little house in Kolomna”, “The Tale of the Priest and of His Workman Balda” by A.S.Pushkin, “The Grand Inquisitor” by F.M.Dostoyevski, “The Mask”, “Pharmacist” by Chekhov and others) were included into its repertoire. In 1921, Azerbaijani satire-agitation theatre was created, on the basis of which Azerbaijani worker-peasant theatre of Baku transferred into Turkish Labor Theatre of Baku in 1927, was established in 1925.

In 1928-1930, Maxim Gorky Azerbaijan State Theatre of Young Spectators and in 1938, Azerbaijan State Theatre of Musical Comedy was established.

In 1922, M.F.Akhundov Azerbaijan State Theatre of Young Spectators of Tbilisi was created on the basis of Azerbaijani Theatre of Tbilisi and it existed until 1947. In 1928, Azerbaijani Theatre was organized in Irevan - it was the first theatre of other nation in Armenia.

Azerbaijani Musical Theatre

Popularity of theatre among nation and development of national Azerbaijani instruments favored formation of a new form of theatrical art – musical theatre. One-acted scenic images to poems such as “Leyli and Majnun” by Fuzûlî and “Farhad and Shirin” by Navai were displayed in 1897-1898, in Shusha and in 1901-1902, in Baku. On January 12, 1908 the first national “Leyli and Majnun” opera by Uzeyir Hajibeyov was staged in Baku. History of professional musical theatre of Azerbaijan was originated since that time. Initially, repertoire of Azerbaijani Musical Theatre consisted of works by U.Hajibeyov, who created “Leyli and Majnun”, “Shaikh Sanan”, “Rostam and Sohrab” “Shah Abbas and Khurshid Banu” operas, and also such musical comedies as “Husband and wife”, “If Not That One, Then This One” and “Arshin mal alan” musical comedies in 1908-1913. Soon, the repertoire of the musical theatre was enriched with new works by Z.Hajibeyov (“Ashiq Garib” opera” and “Fifty years old young” and “Married bachelor” musical comedies), “Shah Ismayil” opera by M.Magomayev, “Molla Jabi” and “Vurhavur” musical comedies by M.M.Kazimski, “Seyfalmulk” opera by M.Amirov and others.

References

 
Azerbaijani-language works